Stephen Broughton (born 8 March 1957) is an Australian former professional rugby league footballer who played for Western Suburbs and Parramatta in the New South Wales Rugby League premiership competition.

Background
Broughton was born in Sydney, Australia.

He attended St Joseph's College where he excelled as a middle distance runner.

Career
Broughton joined the Western Suburbs club where he made his first grade debut in 1978 against Penrith at Penrith Park.
He made only a handful of first grade appearances in his first three seasons until in 1982 he cemented his position on the wing. He played in nearly all games of the 1982, 1983 & 1984 NSWRL seasons.

References

Sources
 Whiticker, Alan & Hudson, Glen (2006) The Encyclopedia of Rugby League Players, Gavin Allen Publishing, Sydney

1957 births
Living people
Australian rugby league players
Western Suburbs Magpies players
Parramatta Eels players
Rugby league wingers
Rugby league players from Sydney
People educated at St Joseph's College, Hunters Hill